Miss Europe 1968 was the 31st edition of the Miss Europe pageant and the 20th edition under the Mondial Events Organization. It was held in Kinshasa, Congo-Kinshasa on September 23, 1968. Leena Marketta Brusiin of Finland, was crowned Miss Europe 1968 by out going titleholder Paquita Torres Pérez of Spain. The pageant was originally scheduled to be held in Nice, France in May but was postponed due to the May-June 1968 civil unrest in France. Congo-Kinshasa later requested the pageant be hosted in their country because they saw it as a good advertisement for them.

Results

Placements

Special awards

Contestants 

 - Brigitte Krüger
 - Sonja Doumen
 - Alžběta Štrkulová
 - Berrit Kvorning
 - Jennifer Lowe Summers
 - Leena Marketta Brusiin
 - Elizabeth Cadren
 - Roswitha Moesi
 - Haris (Charis) Papanikita
 - Marjolijn Ingrid Abbink
 - Helen Knutsdóttir
 - Mary Fitzgerald
 - Paola Rossi
 - Lucienne Krier
 - Kathlene Farrugia
 - Tone Knaran
 - Francisca Delgado Sánchez
 - Anne-Christine Kahnberg
 - Jeanette Biffiger
 - Şule Ekşigil
 - Daliborka Stojšić

Notes

Returns

References

External links 
 

Miss Europe
1968 beauty pageants
1968 in the Democratic Republic of the Congo